Yamaha L2 is a motorcycle produced by Yamaha in Indonesia from 1967 until 1979. In 1980 it was replaced by the L2 Super. 
The 97 cc two-stroke engine uses a  lubrication system named Autolube, with separate oil and fuel tanks.

References

External links
 http://www.yamahaindonesia.com

L2